Thompson Island was a phantom island in the South Atlantic.

History

The island was first reported and named by whaling ship captain George Norris in 1825, supposedly the same day as sighting and landing on Bouvet Island, erroneously thinking the island to be undiscovered and naming it Liverpool Island. The last reported sighting was in 1893. When, however, the German survey ship Valdivia fixed the position of Bouvet in 1898, it then looked for Thompson, but did not find it.

Thompson Island continued to appear on maps published as late as 1943.

In fiction 

 The climax of Geoffrey Jenkins' novel A Grue of Ice is set on Thompson Island.
 Thompson Island inspired the scenario for the novel La pell freda (Cold Skin) by Catalan writer Albert Sánchez Piñol.

See also 
Saxemberg Island
St. Matthew Island (phantom island)

Notes

References 
 Gaddis, Vincent (1965). Invisible Horizons.  Philadelphia: Chilton.
 Stommel, Henry (1984). Lost Islands: The Story of Islands That Have Vanished from Nautical Charts. Vancouver: University of British Columbia Press, pp 98–99. .

External links 
 Thompson Island entry in the "Legends and Sea Stories" layer at BlooSee. Broken link

Phantom islands of the Atlantic
Phantom subantarctic islands
Islands of the South Atlantic Ocean
Volcanoes of the Southern Ocean
Bouvet Island